Persian Iraq, also uncommonly spelled Persian Irak ( Erāq-e Ajam or  Erāq-e Ajami;  ʿIrāq al-ʿAjam or  al-ʿIrāq al-ʿAjamī, literally, "Ajami Iraq"), is a historical region of the western parts of Iran.

The region, originally known as Media in pre-Islamic times, became known as Jibal ("mountain, hill") by  early Islamic geographers, due its mountainous layout. The name was progressively abandoned during the Seljuk era in the 11th-12th centuries, and was called ʿIrāq-i ʿAjam(ī) ("Persian Iraq") to distinguish it from ʿIrāq-i ʿArab(ī) ("Arab Iraq") in Mesopotamia.

According to the medieval historian and geographer Yaqut al-Hamawi, this course started taking place when the Seljuk sultans ruled both Iraq proper and Jibal, thus being addressed "sultan al-Iraq". However, the city of Hamadan in Jibal eventually became their capital, thus resulting in the region becoming known as Iraq, with the word Ajami ("Persian") being added. Following the Mongol invasion of Iran in the 13th-century, the name Jibal had become completely outdated. In the following century, the geographer Hamdallah Mustawfi was unaware of the name Jibal, and only knew it as 'Iraq-i Ajami'. It was regarded by him as sardsīr ("cold zone").

Later, until the beginning of the 20th century, the term Iraq in Iran was used to refer to a much smaller region south of Saveh and west of Qom. This region was centered on Soltanabad, which was renamed later as Arak.

References

Sources
 
 
 
 

Historical regions of Iran
Historical geography of Iran